Rogelio Medina (born September 16, 1988) is a Mexican professional boxer who challenged for the IBF super middleweight title in 2016.

Early life and amateur career
Medina started practicing boxing as a kid. Medina would sneak out of his parents' house to practice at a boxing gym. They were unaware of the fact that Medina practiced boxing until he made the newspapers due to his early success. Medina won multiple medals representing  Sonora at nation-wide competitions.

Professional career
Medina debuted as a pro in June 2007, at the age of 19. In 2008, he won the WBC FECOMBOX super middleweight title. Following his March 2010 win over Demetrius Davis, Medina suffered two fractures in his right hand. The injury kept him sidelined for 8 months.

Medina won his first 22 fights, 16 of them by way of knockout. On December 17, 2010, Medina faced undefeated Gilberto Ramírez for the vacant WBC Youth middleweight title. The bout was held at the Gimnasio German Evers in Mazatlán, Sinaloa, Mexico. Medina was knocked down in round 6 before the referee waived the count, giving Ramírez the win. Medina then suffered another TKO loss to veteran Yori Boy Campas. Medina suffered a series of losses against the likes of José Uzcátegui and Badou Jack over the next few years, but a knockout win over highly touted prospect J'Leon Love in August 2014 vaunted him into world title contention. Medina was able to corner Love against the ropes and then caught him with a left hook that knocked Love out cold.

After José Uzcátegui was sidelined due to illness, Medina became the mandatory challenger to IBF champion James DeGale. The fight was scheduled to take place on 30 April 2016 at the DC Armory in Washington, DC. DeGale outpointed Medina in a harder than expected fight. DeGale won on all three judges scorecards (117-111, 116-112 and 115–113). The fight averaged of 342,000 viewers and peaked at 397,000 on Showtime. Medina threw over a thousand punches during the fight and he had some success cutting off the ring and cornering DeGale, but DeGale was ultimately able to win the fight with his skills, landing about half of his punches.

Medina was knocked out by David Benavidez in May 2017 in a WBC eliminator. On round 8, Benavidez landed an incredible flurry of punches to Medina's face that ended the fight in dramatic fashion. Medina was dropped twice during the fight.

Professional boxing record

{|class="wikitable" style="text-align:center
|-
!
!Result
!Record
!Opponent
!Type
!Round, time
!Date
!Location
!Notes
|-
|50
|Win
|41–9
|align=left|Oscar Meza
|KO
|3 (8), 
|Oct 7, 2022
|align=left|
|align=left|
|-
|49
|Win
|40–9
|align=left|Javier Carrera Tinajero
|TKO
|3 (8), 
|Jul 2, 2022
|align=left|
|align=left|
|-
|48
|Win
|39–9
|align=left|Edgar Santoyo Escalante
|TKO
|2 (8), 
|Jul 31, 2021
|align=left|
|align=left|
|-
|47
|Win
|38–9
|align=left|Rafael Ortiz Moreno
|KO
|1 (10), 
|Sep 28, 2019
|align=left|
|align=left|
|-
|46
|Loss
|37–9
|align=left|Caleb Plant
|UD
|12
|Feb 17, 2018
|align=left|
|align=left|
|-
|45
|Win
|37–8
|align=left|Christian Solorzano
|TKO
|3 (8), 
|Sep 1, 2017
|align=left|
|align=left|
|-align=center
|44
|Loss 
|36–8
|align=left|David Benavidez
|KO
|8 (12), 
|May 20, 2017
|align=left|
|align=left|
|-align=center
|43
|Win
|36–7
|align=left|Ramon Olivas
|TKO
|2 (10), 
|Dec 23, 2016
|align=left|
|align=left|
|-align=center
|42
|Loss || 35–7 ||align=left|James DeGale
|UD|| 12 || Apr 30, 2016 || align=left |
|align=left|
|-align=center
|41
|Win || 35–6 ||align=left|Samuel Miller
|KO|| 2 (8),  || May 9, 2015 || align=left|
|align=left|
|-align=center
|40
|Win || 34–6 ||align=left|Ernesto Aboyte
|KO|| 1 (6),  || Jan 22, 2015 || align=left|
|align=left|
|-align=center
|39
|Win || 33–6 ||align=left|J'Leon Love
|KO|| 3 (10), || Aug 8, 2014 || align=left|
|align=left|
|-align=center
|38
|Loss || 32–6 ||align=left|Jonathan González
|SD|| 10 || May 1, 2014 || align=left|
|align=left|
|-align=center
|37
|Win || 32–5 ||align=left|Fortino Lugo
|KO|| 1 (8),  || Mar 21, 2014 || align=left|
|align=left|
|-align=center
|36
|Loss || 31–5 ||align=left| Badou Jack
|TKO|| 6 (10),  || Dec 6, 2013 || align=left|
|align=left|
|-align=center
|35
|Loss || 31–4 ||align=left|Marcos Reyes
|MD|| 12 || Oct 5, 2013 || align=left|
|align=left|
|-align=center
|34
|Win || 31–3 ||align=left|Victor Alfonso León
|KO|| 1 (10),  || Sep 13, 2013 || align=left|
|align=left|
|-align=center
|33
|Loss || 30–3 ||align=left| José Uzcátegui
|UD|| 10 || Feb 16, 2013 || align=left|
|align=left|
|-align=center
|32
|Win || 30–2 ||align=left|Jaudiel Zepeda
|TKO|| 3 (10),  || Dec 7, 2012 || align=left|
|align=left|
|-align=center
|31
|Win || 29–2 ||align=left|Luis David Serrano
|RTD|| 5 (10),  || Sep 1, 2012 || align=left|
|align=left|
|-align=center
|30
|Win || 28–2 ||align=left|Leonardo Resendiz
|TKO || 3 (8),  || Jul 19, 2012 || align=left|
|align=left|
|-align=center
|29
|Win || 27–2 ||align=left|José Pinzón
|TKO || 1 (10),  || Mar 31, 2012 || align=left|
|align=left|
|-align=center
|28
|Win || 26–2 ||align=left|Jorge Montoya
|TKO || 4 (8),  || Mar 9, 2012 || align=left|
|align=left|
|-align=center
|27
|Loss || 25–2 ||align=left|Yori Boy Campas
|TKO || 6 (10),  || Jun 17, 2011 || align=left|
|align=left|
|-align=center
|26
|Win || 25–1 ||align=left|Joel Juarez
|TKO || 1 (10),  || May 27, 2010 || align=left|
|align=left|
|-align=center
|25
|Win || 24–1 ||align=left|Arsenio Terrazas
|TKO || 1 (10) || Mar 11, 2010 || align=left|
|align=left|
|-align=center
|24
|Loss || 23–1 ||align=left|Gilberto Ramírez
|TKO || 6 (10),  || Dec 17, 2010 || align=left|
|align=left|
|-align=center
|23
|Win || 23–0 ||align=left|Luis Ignacio Castro
|TKO || 4 (6) || Nov 5, 2010 ||align=left|
|align=left|
|-align=center
|22
|Win || 22–0 ||align=left|Demetrius Davis
|UD || 10 || Mar 5, 2010 ||align=left|
|align=left|
|-align=center
|21
|Win || 21–0 ||align=left|Eduardo Ayala
|UD || 8 || Dec 12, 2009 ||align=left|
|align=left|
|-align=center
|20
|Win || 20–0 ||align=left|Rogelio Sanchez
|KO || 2 (8)|| Oct 16, 2009 ||align=left|
|align=left|
|-align=center
|19
|Win || 19–0 ||align=left|Jose Humberto Corral
|TKO || 2 (8) || Jul 31, 2009 ||align=left|
|align=left|
|-align=center
|18
|Win || 18–0 ||align=left|Jesus Arras Perea
|UD || 6 || Jun 6, 2009 ||align=left|
|align=left|
|-align=center
|17
|Win || 17–0 ||align=left|Christian Solano
|UD || 8 || Mar 28, 2009 ||align=left|
|align=left|
|-align=center
|16
|Win || 16–0 ||align=left|Joel Juarez
|RTD || 2 (8),  || Feb 14, 2009 ||align=left|
|align=left|
|-align=center
|15
|Win || 15–0 ||align=left|Eliu Dueñas
|TKO || 1 (10),  || Dec 13, 2008 ||align=left|
|align=left|
|-align=center
|14
|Win || 14–0 ||align=left|Daniel Yocupicio
|RTD || 1 (8),  || Nov 14, 2008 ||align=left|
|align=left|
|-align=center
|13
|Win || 13–0 ||align=left|Jose Humberto Corral
|UD || 6 || Oct 4, 2008 ||align=left|
|align=left|
|-align=center
|12
|Win || 12–0 ||align=left|Arturo Lopez
|TKO || 3 (12),  || Aug 30, 2008 ||align=left|
|align=left|
|-align=center
|11
|Win || 11–0 ||align=left|Jesus Raul Paez
|RTD || 4 (6),  || Jul 12, 2008 ||align=left|
|align=left|
|-align=center
|10
|Win || 10–0 ||align=left|Javier Arce
|KO || 1 (4),  || Jun 13, 2008 ||align=left|
|align=left|
|-align=center
|9
|Win || 9–0 ||align=left|Rogelio Sanchez
|UD || 6 || May 30, 2008 ||align=left|
|align=left|
|-align=center
|8
|Win || 8–0 ||align=left|Fausto Sandoval Lopez
|TKO || 1 (6),  || Apr 25, 2008 ||align=left|
|align=left|
|-align=center
|7
|Win || 7–0 ||align=left|Noe Flores
|KO || 1 (6),  || Mar 14, 2008 ||align=left|
|align=left|
|-align=center
|6
|Win || 6–0 ||align=left|Benito Abel Ruiz
|KO || 1 (4),  || Mar 6, 2008 ||align=left|
|align=left|
|-align=center
|5
|Win || 5–0 ||align=left|Armando Campas
|TKO || 1 (6),  || Feb 22, 2008 ||align=left|
|align=left|
|-align=center
|4
|Win || 4–0 ||align=left|Jesus Esquer
|KO || 1 (4),  || Nov 16, 2007 ||align=left|
|align=left|
|-align=center
|3
|Win || 3–0 ||align=left|Antonio Contreras
|KO || 1 (4),  || Sep 28, 2007 ||align=left|
|align=left|
|-align=center
|2
|Win || 2–0 ||align=left|Jesus Esquer
|TKO || 1 (4),  || Sep 14, 2007 ||align=left|
|align=left|
|-align=center
|1
|Win || 1–0 ||align=left|Alberto Lopez
|KO || 1 (4),  || Jun 29, 2007 ||align=left|
|align=left|

References

External links 
 

Mexican male boxers
Boxers from Sonora
Middleweight boxers
Sportspeople from San Luis Río Colorado
1988 births
Living people